Harry Mortimer Hubbell (30 August 1881 - 24 February 1971) was an American classicist.

Life 
He was born in Belvue, Kansas on 30 August 1881 to Mortimer Barnett and Hannah Virginia Buzzard. He was married to Alice Pendleton Clark.  He died on 24 February 1971.

Career 
He was a graduate of Hillhouse High School in New Haven, Connecticut. He received his BA, MA and PhD from Yale University.

He held a visiting professorship at the University of California Berkeley. He was a Fulbright Fellow and, at Goucher College, one of the first John Hay Whitney Professors. 

His main area of research interest was Greek and Latin rhetoric. His dissertation was titled  The Influence of Isocrates on Cicero, Dionysius and Aristides.

References

External links
 

American classical scholars
1881 births
1971 deaths
Yale University alumni
Goucher College faculty and staff
Fulbright alumni